Tachygyna is a genus of North American sheet weavers that was first described by Ralph Vary Chamberlin & Vaine Wilton Ivie in 1939.

Species
 it contains fifteen species, all found in North America:
Tachygyna alia Millidge, 1984
Tachygyna cognata Millidge, 1984
Tachygyna coosi Millidge, 1984
Tachygyna delecta Chamberlin & Ivie, 1939
Tachygyna exilis Millidge, 1984
Tachygyna gargopa (Crosby & Bishop, 1929)
Tachygyna haydeni Chamberlin & Ivie, 1939
Tachygyna pallida Chamberlin & Ivie, 1939
Tachygyna proba Millidge, 1984
Tachygyna sonoma Millidge, 1984
Tachygyna speciosa Millidge, 1984
Tachygyna tuoba (Chamberlin & Ivie, 1933)
Tachygyna ursina (Bishop & Crosby, 1938)
Tachygyna vancouverana Chamberlin & Ivie, 1939 (type)
Tachygyna watona Chamberlin, 1949

See also
 List of Linyphiidae species (Q–Z)

References

Araneomorphae genera
Linyphiidae
Spiders of North America